Nominative and structural type systems are:
Nominative type system
Structural type system

The differences between nominative and structural type systems are discussed in:
Type system
Subtyping

Data types
Type theory